Ralph Edward Beardsley (December 10, 1891  – March 18, 1920) was an American racecar driver who participated in the 1911 Indianapolis 500.

Biography
He was born on December 10, 1891 in Ansonia, Connecticut. He participated in the 1911 Indianapolis 500.

He drowned in a boating accident on March 18, 1920, near Craney Island, Virginia in Norfolk Bay when his boat capsized in a storm.

Indy 500 results

References

1891 births
1920 deaths
Indianapolis 500 drivers
People from Ansonia, Connecticut
Racing drivers from Connecticut